Oberach is a river in the Innviertel of the Austrian state of Upper Austria. It is a tributary of the Antiesen. Its source is in the municipality of Pramet. Below its confluence with the Breitsach in Ried im Innkreis, it is also called .

References

Rivers of Upper Austria
Rivers of Austria